KOJB 90.1 FM is a Community radio station, owned and operated by the Leech Lake Band of Ojibwe. Licensed to Cass Lake, Minnesota, the station serves the Leech Lake Indian Reservation.

See also
List of community radio stations in the United States

References

External links
KOJB's website

Community radio stations in the United States
Native American radio
Radio stations in Minnesota
Ojibwe culture